Vyner is a surname. 

Vyner may also refer to:

 Charles Vyner Brooke or Vyner of Sarawak (1874–1963), third White Rajah of Sarawak
 Vyner baronets, an extinct title in the Baronetage of England
 Vyner Street, a street in Cambridge Heath, London, England

See also
 Vyners School, a secondary school and specialist college in the London Borough of Hillingdon